The 1993 Tour of the Basque Country was the 33rd edition of the Tour of the Basque Country cycle race and was held from 5 April to 9 April 1993. The race started in Errenteria and finished at the  outside Urretxu. The race was won by Tony Rominger of the CLAS–Cajastur team.

General classification

References

1993
Bas